The Quilter Cup (formerly the Old Mutual Wealth Cup) is a rugby union trophy awarded to the winner of the annual test/non-test match between England and other home nations as well as Barbarians. It is currently the Barbarians since their victory in 2022.

Creation of the trophy was revealed on 2 December 2015 when RFU announced a four-year partnership with Old Mutual Wealth, part of Old Mutual.

The inaugural Old Mutual Wealth Cup match was won by England, who beat Wales 27–13 at Twickenham Stadium on 29 May 2016.

From 2018 the competition was renamed to reflect the new name of the sponsor Quilter plc.

Results

Notes

References

Rugby union trophies and awards
England national rugby union team
Barbarian F.C.
Wales national rugby union team